Mokil, or known to the locals as Mwoakilloa, is an atoll and one of 6 outer-island municipalities in the state of Pohnpei, Federated States of Micronesia. Almost 200 people live on a land area of about 1 square km.

The atoll was formerly known as Wellington Island.

The atoll is home to a local legend of a Princess Eti, who could speak in many tongues, and communicated with the first French explorers to the island.

See also
 Madolenihmw
 Kitti (municipality)
 U, Pohnpei
 Nett
 Kapingamarangi
 Pingelap
 Sapwuahfik
 Nukuoro
 Sokehs
 Kolonia
 Oroluk
 Palikir

References

Statoids.com, retrieved December 8, 2010

Municipalities of Pohnpei